This is a list of notable visual artists from, or associated with, Egypt.

A
 Mohamed Abla (born 1953), painter
 Inji Aflatoun (1924–1989), painter
 Armen Agop (born 1969), sculptor
 Mariam A. Aleem (1930–2010), painter
 Doa Aly (born 1976), painter
 Ghada Amer (born 1963), artist 
 Sawsan Amer, painter
 Heba Amin (born 1980), artist
 Kamal Amin (1923–1979), graphic artist
 Evelyn Ashamallah (born 1948), Coptic painter
 Alaa Awad (born 1981), muralist, street art, painter
 Islam el Azzazi, photographer and filmmaker

B
 Clea Badaro (1913–1968), painter
 George Bahgoury (born 1932), artist and caricaturist
 Lara Baladi (born 1969), Egyptian-Lebanese multimedia artist 
 Bek, sculptor

C
 Chico (born 1985 or 1986), graffiti and street artist

D
 Dina Danish (born 1981), multimedia artist
 Yehia Dessouki (born 1978), digital and mixed media artist

E
 Doaa El-Adl (born 1979), cartoonist
 Gamal El-Sagini (1917–1977), sculptor
 Samir Elmesirri (born 1941), artist
 Ahmed Emad Eldin (born 1996), digital artist

G
 Hussein El Gebaly (1934–2014), painter
 Habib Gorgi (1892–1965), landscape painter
 Sherin Guirguis (born 1974), contemporary artist

H
 Tahia Halim (1919–2003), painter
 Nermine Hammam (born 1967), visual artist, photographer
 Fathi Hassan (born 1957), installation artist
 Hassan Mohamed Hassan (1906–1990), painter
 Susan Hefuna (born 1962), visual artist
 Adam Henein (1929-2020), sculptor
Menhat Helmy (1925-2004), painter and printmaker
 Hassan Heshmat (1920–2006), sculptor
 Mustafa Hussein (1935–2014), painter and cartoonist

K
 Amal Kenawy (1974–2012), video and performance artist
 Hend Kheera (born 1981), street artist

L
 Van Leo (1921–2002), photographer

M
 Mohamed Nagy (1888–1956), painter
 Mahmoud Mokhtar (1891–1934), sculptor
 Ahmed Morsi (born 1930), poet and painter
 Ramzi Moustafa (1926-2015) visual artist in the Hurufiyya movement
Miral Mokhtar (born 1996) visual artist

N
 Youssef Nabil (born 1972), artist and photographer
 Ahmad Nady (born 1981), comic artist and cartoonist
 Effat Nagy (1905–1994), artist
 Sabah Naim (born 1967), multimedia artist
 Margaret Nakhla (1908–1977), painter
 Moataz Nasr (born 1961), painter and sculptor

S
 Senewosret-Ankh, sculptor
 Gazbia Sirry (born 1925), painter
 Nadia Sirry (born 1958), painter
 Sherif Sonbol (born 1956), photographer

T
 Nazir Tanbouli (born 1971), mural painter
 Aya Tarek (born 1989), painter and muralist
 Arto Tchakmaktchian (1933-2019), painter and sculptor
 Thutmose, sculptor
Diane Tuckman, silk artist

V
 Dom Hubert van Zeller (1905–1984), writer and sculptor

W
 Adham Wanly (1908–1959), painter
 Seif Wanly (1906–1979), painter

References 

 
Artists
Egyptian